Abacetus simplex is a species of ground beetle in the subfamily Pterostichinae. It was described by Blackburn in 1890.

References

simplex
Beetles described in 1890